Partulina perdix is a species of tropical air-breathing land snail, a terrestrial pulmonate gastropod mollusk in the family Achatinellidae. This species is endemic to Maui, Hawaii in the United States.

References

External links 
 Photo of Partulina perdix

Partulina
Gastropods described in 1850
Taxonomy articles created by Polbot